Augusto dos Santos Sakai (born May 19, 1991) is a Brazilian mixed martial artist who formerly competed in Bellator MMA and is now competing in the Heavyweight division of the UFC.

Mixed martial arts career

Early career
Sakai made his professional MMA debut in October 2011 in his native Brazil. In the first two years of his career, he amassed a record of six wins and no losses with all but one of his wins coming via knockout.

Bellator MMA
Sakai made his debut for Bellator MMA in March 2013, defeating Rob Horton by knockout due to a knee.

Sakai returned to the promotion in 2015 with bouts against Daniel Gallemore and Alex Huddleston. He won both fights via TKO.

Sakai faced Dan Charles at Bellator 155 on May 20, 2016. The bout ended in a majority draw.

Sakai faced Cheick Kongo at Bellator 179 on May 19, 2017. He lost the fight via split decision.

Ultimate Fighting Championship
Sakai made his promotional debut against Chase Sherman on September 22, 2018, at UFC Fight Night 137. He won the fight via TKO in the third round.

Sakai faced Andrei Arlovski on April 27, 2019 at UFC Fight Night: Jacaré vs. Hermansson. He won the fight via split decision.

In his third fight for the promotion, Sakai faced Marcin Tybura on September 14, 2019 at UFC Fight Night 158. He won the fight via knockout in the first round. Subsequently, Sakai signed a new, six-fight contract with the UFC.

Sakai was scheduled to face Blagoy Ivanov on May 9, 2020 at then UFC 250. Due to the event being relocated to the United States, Sakai being unable to compete due to visa issues. However, on April 9, Dana White, the president of UFC announced that this event was postponed and the eventually the bout took place on May 30, 2020 at UFC on ESPN: Woodley vs. Burns. He won the fight via a split decision.

Sakai faced Alistair Overeem on September 5, 2020 at UFC Fight Night 176. Despite his early success, he was eventually dominated by the veteran and lost the fight via technical knockout in the fifth round.

Sakai was expected to face Shamil Abdurakhimov on May 1, 2021 at UFC on ESPN 23. However Abdurakhimov pulled out of the bout with visa issues, and Sakai instead faced Jairzinho Rozenstruik on June 5, 2021 at UFC Fight Night: Rozenstruik vs. Sakai. He lost the fight via knockout with one second left in the first round.

Sakai was expected to face Tai Tuivasa on November 20, 2021 at UFC Fight Night 198. However due to visa issues for Tuivasa, the bout was scrapped. The pair was rescheduled and met on December 11, 2021 at UFC 269. Sakai lost the fight via knockout in the second round.

Sakai faced Sergey Spivak on August 6, 2022 at UFC on ESPN 40. He lost the fight via technical knockout in round two.

Sakai faced Don'Tale Mayes on February 25, 2023, at UFC Fight Night 220. He won the fight via unanimous decision.

Personal life
Sakai is the grandson of Japanese immigrants to Brazil and he works at an aquarium store between fights.

Mixed martial arts record

|-
|Win
| style="text-align:center" | 16–5–1
|Don'Tale Mayes
|Decision (unanimous)
|UFC Fight Night: Muniz vs. Allen
|
|align=center|3
|align=center|5:00
|Las Vegas, Nevada, United States
|
|-
|Loss
| style="text-align:center" | 15–5–1
|Sergey Spivak
|TKO (punches)
|UFC on ESPN: Santos vs. Hill
|
| style="text-align:center" | 2
| style="text-align:center" | 3:42
|Las Vegas, Nevada, United States
|
|-
|Loss
| style="text-align:center" | 15–4–1
|Tai Tuivasa
|KO (punches)
|UFC 269
|
| style="text-align:center" | 2
| style="text-align:center" | 0:26
|Las Vegas, Nevada, United States
|
|-
|Loss
| style="text-align:center" | 15–3–1
|Jairzinho Rozenstruik
|TKO (punches)
|UFC Fight Night: Rozenstruik vs. Sakai
|
| style="text-align:center" | 1
| style="text-align:center" | 4:59
|Las Vegas, Nevada, United States
|
|-
|Loss
| style="text-align:center" | 15–2–1
|Alistair Overeem
|TKO (elbows and punches)
|UFC Fight Night: Overeem vs. Sakai
|
| style="text-align:center" | 5
| style="text-align:center" | 0:26
|Las Vegas, Nevada, United States
|
|-
|Win
| style="text-align:center" | 15–1–1
|Blagoy Ivanov
|Decision (split)
|UFC on ESPN: Woodley vs. Burns
|
| style="text-align:center" | 3
| style="text-align:center" | 5:00
|Las Vegas, Nevada, United States
|
|-
|Win
| style="text-align:center" | 14–1–1
|Marcin Tybura
|KO (punches)
|UFC Fight Night: Cowboy vs. Gaethje
|
| style="text-align:center" | 1
| style="text-align:center" | 0:59
|Vancouver, British Columbia, Canada
|
|-
|Win
| style="text-align:center" | 13–1–1
|Andrei Arlovski
|Decision (split)
|UFC Fight Night: Jacaré vs. Hermansson
|
| style="text-align:center" | 3
| style="text-align:center" | 5:00
|Sunrise, Florida, United States
|
|-
|Win
| style="text-align:center" | 12–1–1
|Chase Sherman
|TKO (punches)
|UFC Fight Night: Santos vs. Anders
|
| style="text-align:center" | 3
| style="text-align:center" | 4:03
|São Paulo, Brazil
|
|-
|Win
| style="text-align:center" | 11–1–1
|Marcos Conrado
|TKO (punches)
|Dana White's Contender Series Brazil 1
|
| style="text-align:center" | 2
| style="text-align:center" | 3:09
|Las Vegas, Nevada, United States
|
|-
|Win
| style="text-align:center" | 
|Tiago Cardoso
|TKO (punches)
|Imortal FC 7
|
| style="text-align:center" | 1
| style="text-align:center" | 2:17
|São José dos Pinhais, Brazil
|
|-
|Loss
| style="text-align:center" | 9–1–1
|Cheick Kongo
|Decision (split)
|Bellator 179
|
| style="text-align:center" | 3
| style="text-align:center" | 5:00
|London, England
|
|-
|Draw
| style="text-align:center" | 9–0–1
|Dan Charles
|Draw (majority)
|Bellator 155
|
| style="text-align:center" | 3
| style="text-align:center" | 5:00
|Boise, Idaho, United States
|
|-
| Win
| style="text-align:center" | 9–0
| Alex Huddleston
| Decision (unanimous)
| Bellator 145
| 
| style="text-align:center" | 3
| style="text-align:center" | 5:00
| St. Louis, Missouri, United States
| 
|-
| Win
| style="text-align:center" | 8–0
| Daniel Gallemore
| TKO (retirement)
| Bellator 139
| 
| style="text-align:center" | 2
| style="text-align:center" | 5:00
| Mulvane, Kansas, United States
| 
|-
| Win
| style="text-align:center" | 7–0
| Matt Frembling
| TKO (knees and punches)
| Bellator 122
| 
| style="text-align:center" | 3
| style="text-align:center" | 3:32
| Temecula, California, United States
| 
|-
| Win
| style="text-align:center" | 6–0
| Edison Lopes
| Decision (unanimous)
| Golden Fighters 8
| 
| style="text-align:center" | 3
| style="text-align:center" | 5:00
| Novo Hamburgo, Brazil
| 
|-
| Win
| style="text-align:center" | 5–0
| Rob Horton
| KO (knee)
| Bellator 94
| 
| style="text-align:center" | 2
| style="text-align:center" | 4:01
| Tampa, Florida, United States
| 
|-
| Win
| style="text-align:center" | 4–0
| Arley Simetti
| KO (knee)
| Samurai FC 9: Water vs. Fire
| 
| style="text-align:center" | 1
| style="text-align:center" | 2:04
| Curitiba, Brazil
| 
|-
| Win
| style="text-align:center" | 3–0
| Dayvisson Daniel
| TKO (punches)
| Evolution Fight Combat 3
| 
| style="text-align:center" | 1
| style="text-align:center" | 0:00
| Curitiba, Brazil
| 
|-
| Win
| style="text-align:center" | 2–0
| Marcio Fernando
| TKO (punches)
| Power Fight Extreme 6
| 
| style="text-align:center" | 1
| style="text-align:center" | 0:35
| Curitiba, Brazil
| 
|-
| Win
| style="text-align:center" | 1–0
| Cesar Alberto
| KO (punches)
| Adventure Fighters Tournament
| 
| style="text-align:center" | 1
| style="text-align:center" | 1:54
| Curitiba, Brazil
|
|-

See also
 List of current UFC fighters
 List of male mixed martial artists

References

External links
 
 

1991 births
Brazilian male mixed martial artists
Heavyweight mixed martial artists
Mixed martial artists utilizing Brazilian jiu-jitsu
Brazilian people of Japanese descent
Brazilian practitioners of Brazilian jiu-jitsu
Living people
Sportspeople from Curitiba
Ultimate Fighting Championship male fighters